Beyond the Mask is a 2015 American Christian historical action-adventure film directed by Chad Burns and starring Andrew Cheney, John Rhys-Davies, and Kara Killmer. The film follows an ex-mercenary (Andrew Cheney) during the American Revolution who attempts to redeem himself from a life of murder by becoming a masked vigilante to overthrow the British in the colonies.

The film was produced under Burns Family Studios and was released by Gathr in select theaters before a mainstream distribution by Freestyle Releasing. Beyond the Mask received negative reviews from critics, but had a warmer reception from Christian film critics. The film was later released on DVD.

Plot 
William Reynolds is an assassin for the British East India Company, who attempts to "retire". His boss Charles Kemp tries to have him killed because he knows too much.  He flees, taking the name and job of a vicar who died saving Will's life.

Will attempts to settle into the quiet life of a vicar (with a surprising degree of success) and falls in love with Charlotte Holloway.  An old associate happens upon the quiet town and confronts Will, who kills the man and buries him under the cover of darkness.  Later, he asks Charlotte to marry him, and she agrees, provided he meets with her uncle's approval.

At Christmas, Charlotte's uncle arrives and is revealed to be Charles Kemp, who discloses William's true identity to Charlotte and tries (again) to kill him. Will flees once more, and, yet again, his rescuer dies saving Will's life. Again, using the identity of his rescuer (Jeremiah Flack), William travels to the colony of Pennsylvania and finds a job in Benjamin Franklin's printing shop after passing Franklin's 'test of faith' and revealing that his sympathies lay with the revolutionary cause.

Will later discovers that Charlotte and her uncle have arrived in America as well, with Kemp supporting the loyalists on behalf of the East India Company. Upon discovering Kemp's plans, Will sets out to redeem his name before reuniting with Charlotte. Working as a printer only by day, he also becomes a masked vigilante by night, thwarting the evil plans of the East India Company, and is dubbed "The Highwayman" by the revolutionaries. Will later attends a masked ball in New York with the intention of revealing some documents he stole earlier that outline the role of the East India Company, specifically Charles Kemp.  He saves the life of George Washington, but is framed and arrested by Kemp as a murderer and loses the document.  He is sentenced to be hanged at dawn.  While in the hole he realizes that someone else took what he deserves, and he accepts the Lord into his heart truly.

Realizing her feelings for William as well as her uncle's evilness, Charlotte steals her uncle's next set of plans and breaks Will out of the prison ship. They flee to Philadelphia where she is captured by her uncle's men. Kemp reveals to her that he has planted barrels of gunpowder under various important buildings in the city, notably Independence Hall where the Continental Congress is debating the Declaration of Independence, with the explosives set to go off at noon, just when the Declaration of Independence is about to be approved.  Will discovers the gunpowder and traces the trigger back through the new sewer system to Windmill Island, where Kemp and his men have set up a generator and are also holding Charlotte. After revealing the plot to Franklin, Will swims to the island, defeats Kemp's men, fights and kills Kemp, rescues Charlotte, and blows up the laboratory, preventing disaster. The Declaration of Independence is passed without incident, much to Franklin's relief.

The two swim back to shore where Franklin and some soldiers are waiting for them with a prison carriage. The surviving loyalists are arrested, while Charlotte insists on accompanying Will.  Out of their earshot, Franklin says that the extradition policy between Pennsylvania and New York is vague. Charlotte and Will discover a note saying that the carriage is not taking Will to prison.  Will gives Charlotte the ring he has been carrying since he first asked her to marry him back in England, she accepts, and the two kiss.

Cast

Production

The idea for the movie began after cousins Aaron and Chad Burns finished their self-produced film called "Pendragon". Aaron said that inspiration for the latter came from novels they both read together when they were younger, and that during their homeschool education they read and analyzed the literature, biography, historical fiction, and culture that inspired their work in the film. Subsequently, they formed Burns Family Studios and started a Kickstarter campaign in 2011 to fund the costs of production, raising $24,010 of their $20,000 goal.

The movie distribution company Gathr was chosen to help distribute the film for one night in selected theaters and it was later marketed by churches, social media, volunteers and homeschooling communities.  Freestyle Releasing later picked it up for release in mainstream theaters; the proceeds from the films distributed alongside the movie by Freestyle, under co-writer Stephen Kendrick's team, were given back by building an 82-acre sports park in Albany and by funding missions and a new church for the communities that marketed it.

Releases

Burns Family Studios released Beyond the Mask on April 6, 2015 and after increasing demand and talks with movie theaters, Burns Family Studios reached an agreement with film distributor Gathr to release the films to 111 movie theaters nationwide on June 5, 2015.

The film was to be released on DVD on Tuesday, September 8, 2015 in 3,900 Walmart stores across the U.S., but some didn't receive copies until a few days later due to a distribution problem.  The DVD was also available on Amazon, ChristianCinema.com, and its own website (beyondthemaskmovie.com), along with a "making-of" book, soundtrack CD (which had been released substantially earlier), and other promotional merchandise.

Reception
Beyond The Mask received negative reviews from critics, but largely positive reviews from selected Christian reviewers.

Review aggregator website Rotten Tomatoes reports a 29% approval rating with an average rating of 5.40/10 based on reviews from 14 critics. Christian movie review site PluggedIn gave the film four out of five "Plugs" (Units for measuring family-friendliness). The Christian media site BreatheCast gave the film four stars, saying "The movie's fight choreography and period costuming are to be commended. With a slim budget of $4 million, Burns Family Productions manages to create a film that visually rivals many big budget movies of the same genre (such as 'The Count of Monte Cristo' and 'Zorro'.)
Justin Chang of Variety (magazine) gave the film a largely negative review, calling it a "a mostly stiff, infrequently stirring attempt to furnish a swashbuckling historical yarn for Christian audiences...onscreen memories...makes a pretty odd fit with Will’s spiritual journey." Chang was positive about the performances, calling the lead actors "likeable leads" and "Rhys Davies['s]...bellicose, two-dimensional villainy makes for undeniably enjoyable viewing."

Movieguide gave the film a largely negative review, concluding that “BEYOND THE MASK is a low quality movie. The story is drawn out for no apparent reason, and the production is television quality.” 
The Los Angeles Times, stated that the film seemed a "stagy, overstuffed costume drama". They also called the film "preachy" and complained of a "cut-and-paste script by Stephen Kendrick and Paul McCusker that manages to drag into the fray Benjamin Franklin (Alan Madlane), who dutifully proceeds to offer up a medley of his greatest quotes."

See also
 List of films about the American Revolution
 List of television series and miniseries about the American Revolution

References

External links 
 
 Burns & Co. Productions on Facebook
 Burns & Co. Productions website
 Focus on the Family's Plugged in review

2010s historical films
2015 action drama films
2015 films
American drama films
American historical films
American films based on actual events
American Revolutionary War films
American action drama films
Cultural depictions of George Washington
Drama films based on actual events
War films based on actual events
2010s English-language films
2010s American films